Francis Alexander Anglin PC (April 2, 1865 – March 2, 1933) was the seventh Chief Justice of Canada from 1924 until 1933.

Born in Saint John, New Brunswick, one of nine children of Timothy Anglin, federal politician and Speaker of the House of Commons of Canada, and elder brother to the renowned stage actress, Margaret Anglin. He was educated at St. Mary's College, and received a Bachelor of Arts degree from the University of Ottawa in 1887. Anglin studied law at the Law Society of Upper Canada (which in those days taught law) and was called to the bar in 1888, establishing a practice in Toronto.  In 1896 he became Clerk of the Surrogate Court of Ontario, and King's Counsel in 1902.

He was appointed to the Exchequer Division of the High Court of Justice of Ontario in 1904 and, thanks to a nomination from the Laurier government, to the Supreme Court of Canada on February 23, 1909, becoming Chief Justice in 1924 thanks to a nomination by the first Mackenzie King government, and serving until his retirement, two days before his death, in 1933.

He was author of Trustees' Limitations and Other Relief (Toronto 1910) and penned the "Ontario" entry for the Catholic Encyclopedia.

References

External links 
 Supreme Court of Canada biography

1865 births
1933 deaths
Chief justices of Canada
Members of the Judicial Committee of the Privy Council
Canadian people of Irish descent
University of Ottawa alumni
Lawyers in Ontario
People from Saint John, New Brunswick
Canadian members of the Privy Council of the United Kingdom
Contributors to the Catholic Encyclopedia
Canadian Roman Catholics